Graeme Robert Ballard (born 16 June 1979) is an English Paralympian athlete with cerebral palsy, who competes mainly in category T36 sprint events.

Graeme was born in Manchester.  He competed in both the T36 100m and 200m in the 2004 Summer Paralympics in Athens winning the bronze medal in 200m.  Four years later, he competed in the 100m, 200m and 400m but won the silver medal in the T36 100m in the 2012 Summer Paralympics.  He has also competed for the national 7-a-side football team and competed at a national level in swimming. Graeme has the world record in T36 100m.

He won two silver medals at the 2014 IPC Athletics European Championships in the T36 100m and 200m in Swansea. He finished just ahead of his teammate Paul Blake in the 100m but on both occasions, the Briton was beaten to the gold medal by the Russian Evgenii Shvetcov. Ballard also reached the final of the 400m where he recorded a personal best of 57.18 to finish in fourth place. He placed fifth in the Rio Paralympic games with 12.84 seconds after a false start that disqualified another Ukrainian athlete and a new Paralympic record being set by a Malaysian athlete.

References

External links
 profile on paralympic.org

Paralympic athletes of Great Britain
Athletes (track and field) at the 2004 Summer Paralympics
Athletes (track and field) at the 2008 Summer Paralympics
Paralympic bronze medalists for Great Britain
British male sprinters
Living people
Athletes (track and field) at the 2012 Summer Paralympics
Paralympic silver medalists for Great Britain
1979 births
World record holders in Paralympic athletics
Track and field athletes with cerebral palsy
Medalists at the 2004 Summer Paralympics
Medalists at the 2012 Summer Paralympics
Medalists at the World Para Athletics Championships
Medalists at the World Para Athletics European Championships
Paralympic medalists in athletics (track and field)